Georges Dransart (May 12, 1924 – June 14, 2005) was a French sprint canoeist, born in Paris, who competed from the late 1940s to the late 1950s. Competing in three Summer Olympics, he won three medals with one silver (C-2 10000 m: 1956) and two bronzes (C-2 1000 m and C-2 10000 m: both 1948).

Dransart won two silver medals at the 1950 ICF Canoe Sprint World Championships, earning them in the C-2 1000 m and C-2 10000 m events.

References

1924 births
2005 deaths
Sportspeople from Paris
Canoeists at the 1948 Summer Olympics
Canoeists at the 1952 Summer Olympics
Canoeists at the 1956 Summer Olympics
French male canoeists
Olympic canoeists of France
Olympic silver medalists for France
Olympic bronze medalists for France
Olympic medalists in canoeing
ICF Canoe Sprint World Championships medalists in Canadian
Medalists at the 1956 Summer Olympics
Medalists at the 1948 Summer Olympics
20th-century French people